Billboard Top Rock'n'Roll Hits: 1961 is a compilation album released by Rhino Records in 1988, featuring 10 hit recordings from 1961.

Two versions of this volume in the "Billboard Top Hits" series were released — one in 1988, the other in 1993. The final four tracks on the original (those by Ernie K-Doe, The Marvelettes, The Tokens and Bobby Vee) are replaced on the re-issue with songs by James Darren, Chris Kenner, Ben E. King and Shep and the Limelites. The remaining six songs were kept in their original order.

All ten songs on the original 1988 release reached the top of the Billboard Hot 100 chart, which included the number one song of 1961, "Tossin' and Turnin'", while the 1993 re-issue only contained six chart toppers. However, the remaining four tracks reached the Hot 100's Top 10. "I Like It Like That, Part 1" and "Daddy's Home" both reached number two, "Stand by Me" was a number four song and "Goodbye Cruel World" topped out at number three. The album was certified Gold by the RIAA on February 16, 1995.

Track listing
Track information and credits taken from the album's liner notes.

References

1988 compilation albums
Billboard Top Rock'n'Roll Hits albums
Pop rock compilation albums